Punja or Poonja may refer to:

H. W. L. Poonja (1910-1997), Hindu teacher
Rana Punja or Punja, Rajput chieftain of  Panarwa, who took part in Battle of Haldighati with his followers, who were mainly Bhil archers.
Hari Punja (born 1936), Indo-Fijian businessman and Chairman of Hari Punja Group of Companies
Jinnahbhai Poonja, father of Muhammad Ali Jinnah
Shubha Punja or Poonja, actress
Yodhin Punja (1999), Emirati cricketer
Punjas Rugby Series, between Fiji A and Tonga A sponsored by Fijian company Punja & Sons
Major Muslim Rajput clans of Punja
Punja Sahib gurdwara situated at Hasan Abdal, Pakistan